"Starlight" is the debut single of French house musician the Supermen Lovers (also known as Guillaume Atlan), featuring Mani Hoffman on lead vocals. The female vocals on the song were performed by Israeli singer-songwriter Nili. The song contains a sample of "The Rock" (1978) by disco assemblage East Coast. "Starlight" was released as the first single from Atlan's debut album, The Player, on 17 March 2001. It became a hit in Norway, New Zealand, and Wallonia, where it reached the top 10, and peaked at number two in France and the United Kingdom.

Italian artist Mango covered the song on the album La Terra Degli Aquiloni (2011).

Music video

The music video starts off floating down to a house where a young "potato" man is making up the song "Starlight" in his bedroom. After finishing the song, he goes to his parents to tell them about it. However, they do not notice him as they are watching a 'Mexican Skeleton' singing on the television. The young man is in awe of how his parents, sitting on the couch like "couch potatoes", are more interested in the act on the television than in their own son. Disappointed, he returns to his bedroom when he begins hearing music coming from a mouse hole. A mouse inside is doing his own work as the young man sees what's going on. Initially, they both begin to co-operate with each other and produce 'Starlight' together.

Then, they try to get a producer to sign them on and call up several producers, but after several failed attempts, the mouse mainly tricks a producer by using the audio from the Mexican Skeleton's song to get the contract. They then run away from their home and begin to head for the big city for a chance of stardom. Once they get on TV, the popularity of their act just goes down in a fast decline as all the viewers watching change back to the Mexican Skeleton. The manager then gets furious and fires the duo.

Meanwhile, a group of aliens pick up the broadcast and enjoy listening to the duo's music, so the alien manager calls them up and asks them if they would like to go to their planet. The duo then jump for joy that someone out there loves their song. Near the end of the video, the spaceship then floats to the house, but in a cruel twist of fate, the alien ship is not big enough for both of them, leaving the young man really upset as his friend and partner gets taken due to the fact he was the smaller of the two. The spaceship then flies away with the mouse while the man is left alone once more. At the end, the mouse is in his luxury apartment having a bubble bath.

Track listings

French and Australian CD single
 "Starlight" (radio edit) – 3:50
 "Starlight" (original version) – 6:00
 "Starlight" (dub version) – 8:46
 "Starlight" (instrumental) – 6:00

French remixes CD single
 "Starlight" (Derrick Carter Remix—BHQ Rub) – 6:12
 "Starlight" (BRS Remix) – 6:50
 "Starlight" (Derrick Carter Remix—jazz radio) – 3:24
 "Starlight" (Agent Sumo Remix) – 7:27

European CD single
 "Starlight" (radio edit) – 3:50
 "Starlight" (original version) – 6:00

UK CD single
 "Starlight" (radio edit) – 3:48
 "Starlight" (Agent Sumo Supermagic Mix) – 7:29
 "Starlight" (BHQ Rub) – 6:18

UK 12-inch single
A1. "Starlight" (radio edit)
A2. "Starlight" (BHQ Rub)
B1. "Starlight" (Agent Sumo Supermagic Mix)

UK cassette single
 "Starlight" (radio edit) – 3:48
 "Starlight" (BHQ radio edit) – 3:26

Credits and personnel
Credits are taken from the French CD single liner notes.

Studio
 Mastered at Translab (Paris, France)

Personnel
 Guillaume Atlan – music, lyrics, production
 Mani Hoffman – lyrics, vocals
 Nili – additional vocals
 Hervé Bordes – mixing, mastering
 Emmanuel Desmadril – mixing
 Adrien de Maublanc – cover artwork

Charts

Weekly charts

Year-end charts

Certifications and sales

Release history

See also
 List of number-one dance singles of 2001 (Australia)
 List of number-one club tracks of 2001 (Australia)

References

2001 songs
2001 debut singles
Animated music videos
Bertelsmann Music Group singles
Independiente (record label) singles
The Supermen Lovers songs